Raza Hasan  (born 8 July 1992) is a Pakistani first-class cricketer. He bowls left-arm orthodox spin and can also bowl the doosra which turns the other way (into the right hand batsman). He was selected to play for the Pakistani national team in replacement of Danish Kaneria for the tour of England in 2010, along with another spinner, Saeed Ajmal. Along with Hasan, another change to the test squad was the addition of veteran Mohammad Yousuf, who retired earlier in the year. Raza was backed by Ijaz Ahmed at the start of his career.

In September 2012, Hasan made his T20 international debut when he played against Australia in the first game of the Australia-Pakistan T20 series in the UAE. He got two wickets in the match.

He made his One Day International debut for Pakistan against Australia in the United Arab Emirates on 10 October 2014.

In May 2015 Hasan was banned from playing any form of cricket for two years, after testing positive for a prohibited substance.

He was the leading wicket-taker for National Bank of Pakistan in the 2017–18 Quaid-e-Azam Trophy, with 32 dismissals in seven matches.

In April 2018, he was named in Federal Areas' squad for the 2018 Pakistan Cup.

References

1992 births
Punjabi people
Living people
Cricketers from Sialkot
Pakistani cricketers
Cricketers at the 2010 Asian Games
Asian Games bronze medalists for Pakistan
Asian Games medalists in cricket
Pakistan One Day International cricketers
Pakistan Twenty20 International cricketers
Sui Northern Gas Pipelines Limited cricketers
Sialkot Stallions cricketers
Zarai Taraqiati Bank Limited cricketers
National Bank of Pakistan cricketers
Pakistan Customs cricketers
Rawalpindi Rams cricketers
Lahore Qalandars cricketers
Islamabad cricketers
Punjab (Pakistan) cricketers
Doping cases in Pakistani cricket
Medalists at the 2010 Asian Games